Celaenorrhinus plagifera is a species of butterfly in the family Hesperiidae. It is found in Sikkim, India.

References

Butterflies described in 1889
plagifera
Butterflies of Asia
Taxa named by Lionel de Nicéville